In software engineering, the Extract Class refactoring is applied when a class becomes overweight with too many methods and its purpose becomes unclear.  Extract Class refactoring involves creating a new class and moving methods and/or data to the new class.

Further reading

http://www.refactoring.com/catalog/extractClass.html

Code refactoring